Rachel de Beer (1831–1843) (sometimes known by the diminutive form, Racheltjie) is an Afrikaner heroine, who gave her life in order to save that of her brother, Dirkie de Beer. She was the daughter of George Stephanus de Beer (b. 1794).

Story
In the winter months of 1843 Rachel was part of a trek from the Orange Free State to the south-eastern Transvaal. During one of their nightly stopovers, the members of the trek realised that a calf called Frikkie, much-beloved by their children, was missing.

A search party was formed, in which Rachel and her six-year-old brother also took part. However, during the gathering dusk Rachel and her brother got separated from the search party and became lost. As the night progressed it got very cold and started snowing.

Realizing that their chances of survival were slim, Rachel found an anthill hollowed out by an aardvark, took off her clothes, put them on her brother and commanded him to get into the hollowed-out anthill. She then lay in front of the opening of the anthill in order to keep out the cold.

The children were found the next morning by the trekking party. Rachel had died during the night, but her brother had survived.

Story in modern culture 

Rachel de Beer is entrenched in the Afrikaner culture, which is evident by the number of streets and schools named after her, and musical pieces which have been inspired by her such as a theatrical performance from 2019.

Genealogical perspective
In the very comprehensive genealogical work “The De Beer Family – Three centuries in South Africa” several pages are devoted to the Rachel de Beer story, looking at all the possibilities from the available genealogical data.

It turns out that there was a De Beer family that fits the names and ages as mentioned in the original story quite closely. However, they lived 60 years later. If the incident happened in 1903 instead of 1843, this family would fit the facts quite nicely. It would also better explain why there is no mention of this story before the early 1900s.

By the third edition of the work more information has come to light to also eliminate this last possible scenario. The Rachel de Beer in this instance has been confirmed to have lived well into adulthood.

Based on this research it seems unlikely that the story of Rachel de Beer is factual.

Historical debate
In October 2012, two Afrikaans journalists published their findings that the story of Racheltjie de Beer bears many similarities to that of the American heroine Hazel Miner. They wrote about it in the tabloid By, a weekly supplement of the three Afrikaans newspapers Die Burger, Beeld, and Volksblad. The very first story about Rachel appeared in print only about a month or three after the North Dakota Children's Home Finder gave Hazel Miner's (true) story the wider publicity that it had deserved. The Afrikaans journalists also posted a more elaborate paper on their findings to the web under the title Die laaste rits bewyse: Racheltjie is bloot 'n afspieëling van Hazel Miner (The last series of evidences: Little Rachel is merely a mirror image of Hazel Miner).

References

1831 births
1843 deaths
Afrikaner people
19th-century South African people
Great Trek
South African people of Dutch descent